The British Athletes Commission (BAC) was set up in 2004 to represent the interests of athletes in Great Britain to decision makers in sport, and to help athletes in member sports set up and maintain athlete representative structures within their sport.

The BAC is an independent organisation representing the views of athletes to major decision making bodies such as the British Olympic Association, UK Sport and national governing bodies.

Structure
 Chair: Victoria Aggar

The Executive consists of:
 The Chair - Victoria Aggar (4 yr term)
 The Vice Chair - Donna Fraser(4 yr term)

Up to six other members (two yr term):
 Senior Independent Director - Dougie Dryburgh
 Athlete - Lizzie Simmonds
 Communications – Lee Murgatroyd
 Medical - Dr Rod Jaques
 Finance – Chris Smith
 Legal - Peter Crowther

References

Athletics in the United Kingdom
Sport in Colchester
2004 establishments in the United Kingdom
Sports organisations of England